Simplimorpha promissa is a moth of the family Nepticulidae. It is widely distributed in southern Europe with the northern limit running approximately along the southern slopes of the Alps and along the Danube.

The wingspan is 4-4.5 mm. There are almost continuous generations in the Mediterranean area, but there are two to three generations in places where only the deciduous Cotinus occurs.

The larvae feed on Cotinus coggyria, Pistacia atlantica, Pistacia khinjuk, Pistacia lentiscus, Pistacia terebinthus, Pistacia vera and Rhus coriaria. They mine the leaves of their host plant. The mine consists of a full depth corridor that only widens little towards the end. Frass is found in a central line, almost filling the corridor. Pupation takes place outside of the mine.

External links
bladmineerders.nl 
Fauna Europaea

Nepticulidae
Moths of Europe
Moths described in 1870